Marian Clarke (née Williams; July 29, 1880 – April 8, 1953) was a Republican member of the United States House of Representatives from New York. She was the second woman elected to Congress from New York, after Ruth Baker Pratt.

Biography 
Clarke was born in Standing Stone, Pennsylvania. She attended the University of Nebraska at Lincoln art school for a year, before she graduated from Colorado College in Colorado Springs, Colorado in 1902. She was elected to Congress in 1933 to fill the vacancy caused by the death of her husband John Davenport Clarke who had died in a car crash on November 5, 1933. She served from December 28, 1933, until January 3, 1935, withdrawing her nomination for reelection prior to the primary of 1934. She died in Cooperstown, New York. She is interred at the Locust Hill Cemetery in Hobart, NY.

See also
 Women in the United States House of Representatives

References

1880 births
1953 deaths
Colorado College alumni
Female members of the United States House of Representatives
Spouses of New York (state) politicians
Women in New York (state) politics
Republican Party members of the United States House of Representatives from New York (state)
University of Nebraska–Lincoln alumni
20th-century American politicians
20th-century American women politicians